Mr. Skygack, from Mars was a comic strip by the American cartoonist A.D. Condo. It appeared in the Chicago Day Book, a Chicago working-class newspaper, from October 2, 1907, to April 1911 in about 400 comic strips and single panels. Like much of Condo's work in this period, the Mr. Skygack feature was syndicated and appeared in many other papers, including The Seattle Star, The Milwaukee Journal, The Spokane Press, The Pittsburgh Press, The Tacoma Times and The Duluth Daily Star.

The comic followed the titular Mr. Skygack, a Martian, on his mission to study humans. Mr. Skygack's comical misunderstandings of Earthly affairs gave Condo the opportunity to comment on and criticize social norms. Skygack subsequently appeared in Condo's ethnic-humor comic strip Osgar und Adolf.

Mr. Skygack, from Mars is considered the first science fiction comic, featuring the first extraterrestrial character in comics history. It also gave rise to the first recorded sci-fi cosplay when a Mr. William Fell was reported wearing a Mr. Skygack costume to a 1908 masquerade.

References

External links
Mr. Skygack, from Mars at Barnacle Press
Sampling of "Mr. Skygack" strips, at Chronicling America

American comic strips
1907 comics debuts
1911 comics endings
Skygack
Science fiction comics
Gag-a-day comics
Satirical comics
Skygack
Skygack
Skygack
Fiction set on Mars
Skygack